Ełk Lake is a fresh water lake in the Masurian Lake District of Poland's Warmia-Mazury Province adjacent to the town of Ełk.

The lake that was created by glacial action during the Pleistocene ice age and has a surface area is 3.82 square kilometres. Its average depth is 15m with 58.2m as a maximum. It is divided into two distinct parts, the northern ("small") and southern ("large"), by a narrows spanned by a bridge.  Primarily fed by the Ełk River from the south west the lake discharges into Lake Sunowo at the north-west, and Lake Szarek at the south west.

Gallery

Lakes of Poland
Lakes of Warmian-Masurian Voivodeship